Thabiso Nkoana (born 28 October 1992) is a South African footballer who plays for Tshakhuma as a striker.

Early life
Thabiso attended Lotus Gardens secondary school in Pretoria West and he is known popularly amongst his friends and former team mates as Jetro .

References

1992 births
Living people
South African soccer players
Association football forwards
Cape Town Spurs F.C. players
SuperSport United F.C. players